Randy Howard may refer to:

 Randy Howard (country singer) (1950–2015), American singer, songwriter, guitarist, publisher and producer
 Randy Howard (fiddler) (1960–1999), American bluegrass, country and old time fiddler